Neterra is a Bulgarian operator for complex telecommunications services and projects in Southeast Europe. The company is established as the first alternative operator of land and satellite stations in Bulgaria. Neterra's data network covers all major cities in Bulgaria and reaches points in Georgia, Greece, Hungary, North Macedonia, Romania, Serbia, Slovakia, Turkey, England, France, Netherlands and Germany.

History

1996
 Neterra is founded by Neven Dilkov, now Chairman of the Society for Electronic Communications.

1997
 Neterra becomes land operator of the following satellite companies - Loral Skynet, Telespazio, KB Impuls Hellas, Triaton.

2000
 The company starts the construction of Sofia Teleport and finally completes it in 2001. Sofia Teleport is a carrier neutral data centre. It is connected with all existing telecom networks in Bulgaria and international operators BT, GTS, Telecom Austria, Verizon Business etc. are colocated at the facility.

2003
 Neterra is the first Bulgarian telecommunication operator to create international interconnection and a "point of presence" in Frankfurt, Germany. At that time the company controls approximately 1/3 of the whole Internet traffic in Bulgaria.

2004
 Neterra completes its national network for transfer of voice and data. The network of Neterra reaches border checkpoints with Romania, Turkey and Greece.
 Neterra starts the development of an IT project called Neterra TV, an internet television that allows Bulgarians around the world to watch Bulgarian television and movies. At present moment more than 300 000 registered users in various geographic points watch on Neterra.TV.

2006
 Neterra is selected as partner of British Telecom in Bulgaria. The communication center of Neterra became PoP No.100 in the global IP network of BT. For 20 years BT has succeeded in extending its MPLS network in the countries from Central and Eastern Europe, Russia and CIS (Community of Independent States).
 The copyright project Neterra.tv for Internet television and television in LAN is completed.
 Neterra commissions the first stage of its largest project for construction of an optical network through Bulgaria, which connects the European and Asian support points - Balkan Fiber Optic Ring (BFOR).

2007
 In the beginning of 2007 Neterra completes a project for crossing the Danube river with fiber optic cable. The project connects the Bulgarian city of Russe with the Romanian town of Guergevo and includes fiber optics between Neterra's Telecom Center Russe and Romanian service providers through the water border between the two countries. Several fibre optics have been placed for greater reliability. The technology of laying and protection of the fiber optics is unique and has been engineered especially for the project.
 Neterra is selected as the point of presence of Verizon for Central and Eastern Europe.
 British Telecom comes to Sofia and decides to collocate Point-of-Presence at Neterra.

2008
 In March Neterra finishes constructing own fiber optic network with ring topology in Bulgaria. Now Neterra's Points-of-Presence are more than 30.
The project, that started in December 2004, was the first "green" investment in the field of telecommunications in Bulgaria, specially designed to serve the international transit market between Europe and Asia.
The purpose of the project is to build a new telecommunication infrastructure on the Balkan Peninsula, that is managed from a single place and offers reliable services to international operators, using transit traffic through the Balkans.
In its Bulgarian section the cable system crosses directly between the cities of Russe and Svilengrad, using the shortest possible route. It connects three borders of Bulgaria - Romania to the north and Turkey and Greece to the south. Neterra offers one-stop-shopping of telecommunication services between Europe and Asia, that include SDH services (n x 64 kbit/s up to STM-16) and Carrier Class Ethernet (up to n x 10 Gbit/s).

2009
 Sofia Teleport is a satellite ground station in the region, which broadcast on the Astra 2C satellite, at 31.5°E.
 BIX.BG - The first Bulgarian Internet exchange point chooses Neterra's "Sofia Data Center" for placing its equipment.
 Neterra starts the IPTV service QUARTO in cooperation with the largest Bulgarian mobile operator – Mtel.
Neterra's Complete Modular IPTV Infrastructure System is basically an interconnected system where video content is acquired, prepared, encoded, stored and streamed to the partner both live and on-demand. It is complete with statistical (people metrics) module, billing and payment modules.

2010
 Neterra has an access point in Paris in the Equinix Telehouse Paris 2 data center, as well as in Amsterdam in the InterXion data center.

2011
 Neterra launches its new colocation facility, Sofia Data Center (SDC) - the newest in the region and the only one designed for data center from the planning stage in the last 15 years. A few months later SDC is nominated for New Data Center at European Data Center Awards 2011 and won Special Prize of the Jury at ICT Summit Eurasia Awards 2011.

2012
 Neterra along with 8 other organizations founded Bulgarian Food Bank with a primary goal - collection and management of donated food in accordance with the safety standards.
 Cloudware is launched, Neterra's cloud platform of IaaS (Infrastructure as a Service) type.

2013
 Neterra in partnership with Telenor launched “W1”, a platform for satellite TV services which enables operators to deliver DTH services to end users. Neterra became a reseller of DE-CIX services in Bulgaria and enables new members to connect easily to the Internet exchange point in Frankfurt. Cloudware, Neterra cloud platform won the prize in Start-up Business category at Forbes E-volution Awards.

Services

IP Transit
Colocation
Virtual Private Networks (VPN)
International and Intercity Leased Lines
Building and Maintenance of Clients Network
VSAT Installation
Radio Relay Lines
Broadcast via Satellite
Video and Radio Streaming
SNG from Sofia Teleport
GPS services
Defence against DDoS attacks
Playout-as-a-service

References

External links 
 Official Neterra Website
 Neterra TV
 QUARTO
 Sofia Data Center Website

Telecommunications companies of Bulgaria